Russell George Bennett  (born 22 November 1971) is a South African former rugby union player.

Playing career
Bennett made his test debut for the Springboks as a replacement in 1997 against  at Newlands in Cape Town. He then played in two test matches against the touring British Lions team and in three test matches during the 1997 Tri Nations Series. The previous year, 1996, he toured with the Springboks to Argentina and Europe and played four tour matches, scoring three tries.

Test history

See also
List of South Africa national rugby union players – Springbok no. 640

References

1971 births
Living people
South African rugby union players
South Africa international rugby union players
Rugby union players from the Eastern Cape
Rugby union fullbacks
Sharks (Currie Cup) players
Border Bulldogs players